Lumezi District is a district of Eastern Province, Zambia. It was made independent from Lundazi District in 2018.

Tumbuka is the predominant language spoken in the district about 99.9%.

References 

Districts of Eastern Province, Zambia